The 1996 UEFA Cup Winners' Cup Final was a football match contested between Paris Saint-Germain of France and Rapid Wien of Austria. It was the final match of the 1995–96 UEFA Cup Winners' Cup and the 36th Cup Winners' Cup final. The final was held at King Baudouin Stadium in Brussels on 8 May 1996, hosting its first European club final since the scenes of the Heysel Stadium disaster eleven years prior. Paris Saint-Germain won the match 1–0, thanks to a free kick from Bruno Ngotty.

Excluding their victory in the 2001 Intertoto Cup, this remains the last occasion in club history where PSG has won a major European competition.

Route to the final

Match

Details

See also
1995–96 UEFA Cup Winners' Cup
1996 UEFA Champions League Final
1996 UEFA Cup Final

References

External links
UEFA Cup Winners' Cup results at Rec.Sport.Soccer Statistics Foundation

3
Cup Winners' Cup Final 1996
Cup Winners' Cup Final 1996
1996
Uefa Cup Winners Cup Final
International club association football competitions hosted by Belgium
Sports competitions in Brussels
1990s in Brussels
UEFA Cup Winners' Cup Final